Vox Dei may refer to:

Vox Dei (band), an Argentinian rock band
Vox Dei para Vox Dei, a 1974 album by the band
Vox Dei (phrase) (Latin, Voice of God)
Vox Dei (Thomas Scott), a 1624 tract

See also
 Vox populi (disambiguation)
 Vox populi, vox Dei, 'the voice of the people [is] the voice of God'
 Vox Day (Theodore Robert Beale, born 1968), an American writer and activist